B95 (born ), nicknamed Moonbird, is a red knot celebrated for its longevity as the oldest known member of its species.

The bird, a male of the Calidris canutus rufa subspecies of the red knot (a species of shorebird in the sandpiper family), was banded in Río Grande, Tierra del Fuego, Argentina in February 1995 by Patricia González, an Argentine biologist. It has been resighted many times since then, most recently during May 2014 by González in the Canadian Arctic. It also has been recaptured at least three times—the last time in 2007 (aged approximately 14) when it was found to be "as fit as a three-year-old". It is not known how long red knots typically live.

Migration
Although more formally known as B95 (from the "B95" label on the orange band on its leg), it is nicknamed "Moonbird" because its annual migrations along the Atlantic Flyway between Tierra del Fuego and the Canadian Arctic have in total exceeded the distance to the Moon. It flies approximately  a year.

In its migration from Tierra del Fuego, B95 stops off in Delaware Bay in the Northern Hemisphere in spring to feed on horseshoe crab eggs, before proceeding to breeding grounds on an island in the north of Hudson Bay. The red knot population has declined since the 1990s because of the harvesting of Delaware Bay's horseshoe crabs for bait; hence restrictions on harvesting have been put in place. Migrating back to Tierra del Fuego in November for the Southern Hemisphere spring, red knots feed on mussels in the restinga tidal flats there.

Recognition
B95 has become symbolic in efforts to conserve shorebirds.

Writer Phillip Hoose, who worked as a conservationist for many years, tracked B95's movements throughout three years and wrote about him in his book Moonbird: A Year on the Wind with the Great Survivor B95 (2012). The book received an honor in the Robert F. Sibert Award, and was a finalist in the YALSA Award for Excellence in Nonfiction.

There is a statue of B95 in Mispillion Harbor on Delaware Bay. The city of Río Grande in Tierra del Fuego is said to have proclaimed B95 its "natural ambassador".

See also
 List of individual birds

References

External links
 B95's migration route map

Calidris
Birds of the Arctic
Individual birds
Birds of Canada
Birds of Tierra del Fuego
Individual wild animals